Statens offentliga utredningar (SOU), "Swedish Government Official Reports", is the name of an official series of reports of committees appointed and convened by the Government of Sweden for the analysis of issues in anticipation of a proposed legislation before the Riksdag or the issuance of ordinances.

Reports from committees conducted within a Swedish government ministry are published in another series, called "Departementsserien" (Ds, "Ministry Publications Series").

See also
Public inquiry
Royal Commission
White paper

External links
http://www.sou.gov.se/ Homepage
http://www.sweden.gov.se/sb/d/2854/a/19197 "How laws are made"
http://www.regeringen.se/sb/d/1522/a/13504

Law of Sweden
Government of Sweden